Rochester Public Library may refer to:

Rochester Public Library (Illinois) — Rochester, Illinois
Rochester Public Library (Minnesota) — Rochester, Minnesota
Rochester Public Library (New Hampshire) — Rochester, New Hampshire
Rochester Public Library (New York) — Rochester, New York
Rochester Public Library (Pennsylvania) — Rochester, Pennsylvania
Rochester Public Library (Vermont) — Rochester, Vermont
Rochester Public Library (Wisconsin) — Rochester, Wisconsin

See also
Rochester Hills Public Library in Rochester Hills, Michigan.